Delbert Floy (February 28, 1927 – September 27, 2005) was an American politician who served in the Iowa Senate from 1965 to 1969.

He died on September 27, 2005, in Mason City, Iowa at age 78.

References

1927 births
2005 deaths
Democratic Party Iowa state senators